Phosphorus fluoride may refer to any of the following:

Phosphorus trifluoride, PF3
Phosphorus pentafluoride, PF5
Diphosphorus tetrafluoride, P2F4

See phosphorus halides for a complete list of phosphorus halides.

References

Phosphorus compounds